Oktyabrsky (masculine), Oktyabrskaya (feminine) or Oktyabskoye (neuter), from the Russian adjective  meaning "of October", and often memorialising the October Revolution of November 1917, may refer to:

Places

Oktyabrsky
Oktyabrsky, Russia (Oktyabrskaya, Oktyabrskoye), several inhabited localities in Russia
Oktyabrsky, Republic of Adygea, Russia
Oktyabrsky Airport, an airport in the Republic of Bashkortostan, Russia
Oktyabrsky Island in Kaliningrad, Russia
Oktyabrsky Urban Settlement, several municipal urban settlements in Russia
Cape October (Mys Oktyabrsky) in Severnaya Zemlya, Russia
Mys Oktyabrsky (Cape October), Severnaya Zemlya, Russia

Oktyabrskaya
Oktyabrskaya (Minsk Metro), a station of the Minsk Metro, Belarus
Oktyabrskaya (Kaluzhsko-Rizhskaya line), a station of the Moscow Metro, Russia
Oktyabrskaya (Koltsevaya line), a station of the Moscow Metro, Russia
Oktyabrskaya Railway, a broad gauge railway in Russia

Other 
Oktyabrsky (surname) 
Soviet cruiser Admiral Oktyabrsky

See also
Oktyabrsky District (disambiguation), several districts and city districts in the countries of the former Soviet Union
Oktyabrsky Okrug (disambiguation), various divisions in Russia
Aktsyabarski, an urban-type settlement in Belarus